Princeton Graded School is a historic Rosenwald school located at Princeton, Johnston County, North Carolina.  It was built in 1925–1926, is a six-teacher, "H"-shaped frame school building sheathed in brick.  The building has two additions: a one-story, brick hip-roof extension containing two bathrooms; and a low, one-story, brick, asymmetrical gable-roof section that housed the furnace. It retains an original shed-roof porch supported by Doric order posts.  Also on the property are a contributing cemetery (ca. 1934-1961) with less than 20 visible markers and a septic tank (c. 1950).  The school was closed by 1973.

It was listed on the National Register of Historic Places in 2005.

References

Rosenwald schools in North Carolina
African-American history of North Carolina
School buildings on the National Register of Historic Places in North Carolina
School buildings completed in 1926
Buildings and structures in Johnston County, North Carolina
National Register of Historic Places in Johnston County, North Carolina
1926 establishments in North Carolina